Jamshoro District, is a district of Sindh province, Pakistan. Jamshoro city is the capital while Kotri is the largest city of the Jamshoro District. The district borders Dadu district to the north.  To the east, the Indus separates it from Nawab Shah, Matyari and Hyderabad districts.  Thatta district lies to the south, and Karachi district to the south west.  To the west, the Kheerthar Range separates it from the Sindh and Lasbela district of Baluchistan.

Jamshoro District was split from Dadu District in 14th December 2004 It is situated on the west bank of River Indus.

Geography 
The total geographical area of the district is 11,260 square kilometres. It is about 220 kilometers from north to south and about 100 kilometres wide from east to west.  A 2 to 6 kilometres wide belt of the west bank of River Indus is cultivated and irrigated and the remaining land of the district is either hilly or cultivated. Agriculture is the main source of income.
In summer, the northern part (Sehwan) is hotter than that of other parts of the district and normally cool in winter.

The district is rich in limestone, salika sand, gravels, silt, and marble. These minerals are found in Taluka Thano Bula Khan and Sehwan.  Coal is obtained from Lakhra Taluka Manjhand.

Demographics
At the time of the 2017 census, Jamshoro district had a population of 993,908, of which 523,069 were males and 470,702 females. The rural population was 561,287 (56.47%) and urban 432,621 (43.53%). The literacy rate is 46.47%: 55.14% for males and 36.71% for females.

The current population figures are tabulated below:

Religion

The majority religion is Islam, with 95.07% of the population. Hinduism (including those from Scheduled Castes) is practiced by 3.87% of the population, while Christians are 0.98% of the population.

 Hindu temples
 Gobindram Darbar at Manjhand 
 Kathwari Harijan Manhar Mandir

Languages

At the time of the 2017 census, 84.76% of the population spoke Sindhi, 4.13% Urdu, 4.02% Punjabi, 2.76% Pashto, 1.93% Balochi and 1.38% Saraiki as their first language.

Economy 
The majority of the population of the district is rural and they are involved in cultivation. Industrial areas and Power plants are using manpower, while towns are providing business opportunities to the residents. The inhabitants of mountainous area keep cattle while Mallahs o Manchhar Lake earn their living by fishing. Approximately 20% of the district population works for the federal and provincial government.

Nooriabad Industrial Area and Kotri Industrial Area are two big zones of Industries where more than 500 different industries are located..

Jamshoro Power Station, Lakhra Power Project and Kotri Thermal Power Station are the main power units in this district.

Sindh Industrial And Trading Estate
Two main town's of Sindh Industrial and Trading Estate are in Jamshoro District, Kotri and Nooriabad. Having more than 500 production plants which produces Cotton, Rice, Flour, Oil and many more.

Education 
Mehran University of Engineering and Technology, Liaquat University of Medical and Health Sciences and University of Sindh are located in Jamshoro.

Administrative divisions

The district is administratively subdivided into the following tehsil:

 Kotri Tehsil
 Sehwan Sharif Tehsil
 Thana Bulla Khan Tehsil
 Manjhand Tehsil

List of Union Councils
Jamshoro District includes the following Union Councils:

List of Dehs
The following is a list of Jamshoro District's dehs, organised by taluka:

 Kotri Taluka (26 dehs)
 Andhi-Je-Kasi
 Bada Jaghir
 Bada Rayati
 Belo Gugh
 Chhib
 Dabhon
 Kandh Wingo
 Karo-Khoho
 Khanpur, Jamshoro
 Kotri
 Manjho Jagir
 Manhjo Rayti
 Morho Jabal
 Mulas
 Nadhi Buhni
 Petaro Jagir
 Petaro Rayati
 Rahir
 Railo
 Saloi
 Sonwalhar
 Tango
 Tarband
 Ukhri Kass
 Vee
 Wagan Wari
 Manjhand Taluka (50 dehs)
 Abad
 Amri
 Badhpur
 Belo Unerpur
 Bhacha
 Bhadar
 Bhambhara
 Bhiyan
 Bhorawah
 Bug
 Butho
 Chachhar
 Dabhi
 Dabhri
 Dumb
 Elchi
 Gaincha
 Givari
 Gor Had
 Jhalo
 Kachi
 Kandher
 Karahi
 Kastor
 Khakoor
 Khasai
 Kheraji
 Khuman
 Korejani
 Kubi
 Kun
 Lakha
 Lakhri
 Laki
 Lellan
 Manjhand
 Meeting
 Nea Jetharo
 Noorpur
 Ocho
 Rajri
 Rio Katcho Unerpur
 Sann
 Shoorki
 Tangyani
 Thatti
 Thebat
 Unerpur
 Wachharo
 Wadi Behani
 Sehwan Taluka (71 dehs)
 Abad
 Akri Jageer
 Akri Rayati
 Aktar
 Arazi
 Arbi
 Bado Jabal
 Bagh Yousif
 Baid
 Bajara
 Barki
 Bhambha
 Bhan
 Bhootra
 Bhundhri
 Bilawalpur
 Bilhan
 Bilhni
 Bubuk
 Bukhtiar Pur
 Channa
 Chhachh
 Chorlo
 Dal
 Dalh
 Dhandh-Karampur
 Duri Dero Jageer
 Duri Dero Rayati
 Fazlani
 Gahir
 Gumrachh
 Jafferabad
 Jaheja
 Jatoi
 Jhandiani
 Jhangara
 Kachhi
 Kai
 Kalo Bhori
 Kandi Jabal
 Karampur
 Karyani
 Khabroth Jageer
 Khabroth Rayati
 Khero Dero
 Kot Barocho
 Lashari
 Maheji
 Miliriri
 Munh-Mukhri
 Naing
 Narpirari
 Nighawal
 Peer Hassan
 Radhok
 Rohri
 Saeedabad
 Sehwan
 Shah Gorch
 Shaikh
 Sultanpur
 Super
 Talabad Jabal
 Talti
 Tando Shahbazi
 Tehni
 Therhi Jageer
 Therhi Rayati
 Wahur
 Wanchha
 Yakubani
 Thano Bula Khan Taluka (28 dehs)
 Babar Band
 Bachani
 Batharo-Karchat
 Beli Thap
 Bhall
 Desvi
 Dhamach
 Ghanghiaro
 Hathal Buth
 Kalo Khohar
 Kande-Tarai
 Kapat
 Khajoor
 Koh-Tarash
 Loyachh-Doda Khan
 Loyachh-Sardar Khan
 Mole
 Pat-Karchat
 Pokhan
 Rani Kot
 Rek
 Sari
 Tak Makan
 Thando Arab Khan
 Tiko Baran
 Toung
 Uth Palan
 Wahi Arab Khan

References

Bibliography 

 
Districts of Sindh